Si Vin (also Romanized as Sī Vīn) is a village in Dehsard Rural District, in the Central District of Arzuiyeh County, Kerman Province, Iran. At the 2006 census, its population was 47, in 9 families.

References 

Populated places in Arzuiyeh County